Feyzabad (also Romanized as Feyẕābād; also known as Kalāteh-ye Feyẕābād) is a village in Pain Jovin Rural District, Helali District, Joghatai County, Razavi Khorasan Province, Iran. At the 2006 census its population was 899, in 187 families.

References 

Populated places in Joghatai County